The Coser-Oonk CO-2  "Our Lady" is a single-place, open-cockpit, low-winged monoplane homebuilt aircraft design.

Design and development
The CO-2 was originally started as a mid-wing, but was changed to a low-wing for improved visibility.

The CO-2 is a single-place, strut-braced, low-wing conventional geared monoplane. The tail section is modified from a Luscombe fuselage. The wings were also sourced from a Luscombe, but strut braced from the top and shortened.

Operational history
Test flights were performed at Creve Coeur Airport in 1959.

Specifications (Coser-Oonk CO-2)

See also

References

Homebuilt aircraft